Albert Monks (6 May 1875–1936) was an English footballer who played in the Football League for Blackburn Rovers, Bury and Glossop.

References

1875 births
1936 deaths
English footballers
Association football forwards
English Football League players
Ashton North End F.C. players
Glossop North End A.F.C. players
Stalybridge Rovers F.C. players
Bury F.C. players
Everton F.C. players
Blackburn Rovers F.C. players
Nelson F.C. players
Swindon Town F.C. players
Southport F.C. players